Arsenicicoccus dermatophilus is a bacterium from the genus Arsenicicoccus which has been isolated from the foot skin of the flamingo (Phoenicopterus roseus) which suffered from pododermatitis from a zoological gardens in Basel in Switzerland.

References 

Micrococcales
Bacteria described in 2013